Vilho Koljonen (August 18, 1910 – September 1, 2000) was a Finnish writer, photographer and composer. He was born in Kiihtelysvaara. After 1955 he worked as a teacher in Särkijärvi school. He played quitar. He died in Muonio, aged 90.

Vilho's boy, Veli Koljonen (born 1951) is a famous painter.

Books
 Harmaan kylän laulu: rajakarjalainen idylli, 1943
 Laulava teini: runoja, 1944
 Seikkailu maan alla, (pseudonym Vilcol)
 Salaliitto: alkuperäisten päiväkirjamerkintöjen mukaan kuvailtu, 1953
 Muonion kairoilta, 1978
 Muonion kairoilta 2, 1980
 Muonion kairoilta 3, 1982
 Käsivarren kainalosta, 1998

Some compositions
Nallen kömmähdys
Oli kerran satu
Oman kylän tyttö
Halivilivoo
Kisällit kesällä
Korpijenkka
Lapin sävel
Las ten kodin ka dul la
Lauantain toivottu jenkka

References

1910 births
2000 deaths
20th-century Finnish writers
20th-century Finnish composers
Finnish male composers
20th-century Finnish photographers
People from Kiihtelysvaara
Muonio
20th-century Finnish male musicians